Meienberg is a surname. Notable people with the surname include:

Niklaus Meienberg  (1940–1993), Swiss writer and journalist
Peter Hildebrand Meienberg (1929–2021), Swiss Benedictine missionary

See also
Merenberg

Surnames of Swiss origin